Charles Greville may refer to:

 Charles Francis Greville (1749–1809), British antiquarian, collector and Member of Parliament (MP) for Warwick
 Charles Greville (physician) (1695–1763), British physician
 Charles Greville (1762–1832), MP for Petersfield
 Charles John Greville, MP for Warwick
 Charles Greville (diarist) (1794–1865), English diarist and amateur cricketer
 Charles Greville, 3rd Baron Greville (1871–1952), Baron Greville
 Charles Greville, 7th Earl of Warwick (1911–1984), British peer
 Charles Greville, Lord Brooke

See also
 
 Greville (disambiguation)